The Jackal or MWMIK (from "Mobility Weapon-Mounted Installation Kit") is a family of vehicles designed and developed by Supacat Ltd at their factory in Honiton, Devon, UK, for use by the British Army and Royal Air Force Regiment. 

The primary role of the vehicle in the British Army is deep battlespace reconnaissance, rapid assault and fire support - roles where mobility, endurance and manoeuvrability are important - and it has also been used for convoy protection.

Small production runs are manufactured at the Honiton factory but larger batches are manufactured by DML (part of Babcock Marine Services, owned by Babcock International Group) in Plymouth. The initial order was for up to 100 and it was announced on 27 June 2008 that the MOD would be ordering a further 72. On 23 Jun 2010 it was announced by the Ministry of Defence that 140 additional Jackal 2 vehicles were being ordered, and  this would bring the number of Jackals in service up to 500.

Design and development
The vehicle was procured to provide British forces in Afghanistan with an off-road patrol and fire-support vehicle with increased performance, supplementing the Land Rover Wolf WMIK and the Snatch Land Rover which previously fulfilled the role. In particular the Snatch Land Rover, although able to withstand small arms fire, is vulnerable to improvised explosive devices and was labelled by some a "mobile coffin".

According to the Ministry of Defence, the Jackal "was built to meet the British Army's specific requirements for an agile, well-armed, light patrol vehicle." The vehicle's height-adjustable air suspension system can be lowered onto the bump-stops to provide a stable firing platform when stationary or raised to a maximum   ground clearance allowing it to clear large obstacles. The high levels of off-road mobility enable troops to avoid more conventional routes which may be subject to ambush or enemy reconnaissance.

The vehicle is based on the HMT (High Mobility Transporter) 400 high-mobility 4×4 design developed by a former subsidiary of Supacat, now built under licence from Lockheed Martin. The chassis is built by Universal Engineering Ltd, the engine by Cummins, the transmission by Allison, the suspension shock absorbers by Fox Racing Shox and the electronics package by Fujitsu and Smartgauge Electronics. The blast and ballistic armour packages, and the blast mitigating seating were designed and built by Jankel Armouring Ltd. The vehicles can be fitted with a range of weapons, such as a 12.7 mm heavy machine gun, 7.62 mm general purpose machine gun (GPMG) and 40 mm automatic grenade launcher.

The Ministry of Defence has stated that the design of the vehicle hull incorporates the latest armour protection and that it is considered to be among the best in the world. The HMT 400 mine blast and ballistic protection system was developed for Supacat by Jankel Armouring Ltd. It features armour plating beneath the crew compartment and on the vehicle sides, as well as attenuating seats that absorb shock from any mine blast. The top of the cabin is left open for visibility, which affords the vehicle protection through its manoeuvrability and main armament stand-off distance. These enable it to avoid exposure to riskier IED prone routes. Despite this Jackal crews have suffered a number of IED attacks, some fatal.

Operational history

United Kingdom

War in Afghanistan
Jackal made its operational debut in Operation Herrick, part of the War in Afghanistan, on 8 April 2008 when it was deployed by the British Army's 16 Air Assault Brigade and the Royal Marines 3 Commando Brigade. The vehicle was praised for its off-road performance, with some users likening it to a "dune buggy". The vehicle was also initially praised for its protection; in September 2009, a Royal Marine survived a direct mine explosion whilst in one of the vehicles. By August 2009, however, a total of 13 British soldiers had been killed whilst in the vehicle. This resulted in widespread criticism, with some media outlets calling the vehicle a "deathtrap". Despite not being impervious to IEDs, Jackal remained one of the most favoured patrol vehicles for British troops, according to Defence Minister Quentin Davies. The MOD ordered 110 upgraded models, named the Jackal 2, along with 70 Coyotes, in April 2009 and they were in service from July 2009.

The vehicles were also used by the RAF Regiment; during the September 2012 raid on Camp Bastion, a Taliban RPG struck a Jackal, which wounded its crew. One crew member, Sergeant Geddes, continued to rally his team to defend their position, an action for which he later received the Military Cross.

Post-War in Afghanistan
Despite being procured for the War in Afghanistan, the vehicle has remained in service with the British Army. Following the Army 2020 restructuring, the vehicle now equips three light cavalry regiments and is used primarily for light reconnaissance. It has been deployed in this role with the Light Dragoons in Poland since 2016, in support of NATO's Enhanced Forward Presence. Since 2021, the Light Dragoons have also deployed with the vehicle to Mali as part of the Long Range Reconnaissance Group in support of Operation Newcombe.

In 2020, the Ministry of Defence loaned four Jackal 2 vehicles to the Estonian Defence Forces for their special forces to use in Mali until March 2021 or until they receive their order of Coyote vehicles.

Variants

Jackal 2

An updated version of the Jackal has been ordered as Jackal 2. The crew has been increased to four and the main armament gun ring moved forward to give it an all round arc of fire. The chassis has been upgraded, allowing the vehicle to carry a greater payload and armour, and providing more strength for protection against roadside bombs. It also has a larger 6.7 L engine, although this does not increase the speed of the vehicle. An initial order for "around 110" vehicles was made in 2009, with final deliveries in February 2010. A further order for 140 of the Jackal 2A was announced on 23 June 2010, which is based on the Jackal 2 platform with a blast protection upgrade.

Coyote
Coyote Tactical Support Vehicles are a larger 6×6 design with more than 70 ordered as medium load carriers, artillery tractors and a range of other platform variants.

The Coyote tactical support vehicle (TSV light) is based on the HMT 600 6×6 chassis from Supacat and is a larger derivative of the Jackal 2, the two vehicles are designed to be complementary. The extra two wheels give a heavier vehicle approaching  which will act in support of the Jackal 2 and allow transport of supplies and equipment over similar terrain [the payload for supplies and equipment will be ]. The Coyote has been designed to fulfil the role of a light tactical service vehicle.

Operators

Current operators
 
The UK ordered 100 vehicles initially, followed by a further 72 in 2008 and 140 in 2010. The UK intends to order at least 72 more vehicles and possibly 165 more in future.
 British Army - 431 Jackals and 72 Coyotes in service. 
 Royal Air Force - Unknown quantity used by the RAF Regiment.
 Royal Marines - Unknown quantity used by the Royal Marines.

 Estonian Special Operations Force - Four vehicles loaned from the UK for use in Mali.

Notes

References

External links

Manufacturer's website 
Jackal 1 Technical Data Sheet specifications pictures
Jackal 2 Technical Data Sheet specifications pictures
 
Jackal 1 and Jackal 2
 Jackal 1 & 2 on Armoured Vehicle website

Off-road vehicles
Road vehicles manufactured in the United Kingdom
British Army equipment
Reconnaissance vehicles of the United Kingdom
Military vehicles introduced in the 2000s